Jordi Arrese defeated Juan Aguilera 6–2, 6–2 in the final to secure the title.

Seeds

  Guillermo Pérez Roldán (quarterfinals)
  Juan Aguilera (final)
  Goran Prpić (second round)
  Marcelo Filippini (semifinals)
  Ronald Agénor (first round)
  Franco Davín (first round)
  Jordi Arrese (champion)
  Omar Camporese (quarterfinals)

Draw

Finals

Section 1

Section 2

References

External links
 Official results archive (ATP)
 Official results archive (ITF)

Singles